Rosemary Doreen Ashton,  (née Thomson; born 11 April 1947) is a Scottish literary scholar. From 2002 to 2012, she was the Quain Professor of English Language and Literature at University College London. Her reviews appear in the London Review of Books.

Education and career
Born in Renfrewshire, she was educated at the universities of Aberdeen, Heidelberg, and Cambridge, where her doctoral research was on the reception of German literature in British magazines in the early 1800s.

After lecturing at the University of Birmingham, she started her long teaching and research association with UCL in 1974.

She is a fellow of the British Academy, of the Royal Society of Literature, and of the Royal Society of Arts, and has served on a number of editorial and literary boards, including the George Eliot Fellowship, the advisory board of Carlyle Studies Annual, the advisory board of the Centre for Anglo-German Cultural Relations at Queen Mary, University of London, and the board of the Dr Williams’s Centre for Dissenting Studies. She is a senior research fellow at the Institute of English Studies in the School of Advanced Studies, University of London.

She was the creator of the UCL Bloomsbury Project, which was established to investigate 19th-century Bloomsbury’s development "from swampy rubbish-dump to centre of intellectual life", tracing the origins, Bloomsbury locations, and reforming significance of hundreds of progressive and innovative institutions.

Honours
In the 1999 New Year Honours, Ashton was appointed an Officer of the Order of the British Empire (OBE) "for services to comparative literature". In 2000, she was elected a Fellow of the British Academy (FBA), the United Kingdom's national academy for the humanities and social sciences.

Works
Little Germany: exile and asylum in Victorian England, Oxford University Press, 1986, 
G.H. Lewes: An Unconventional Victorian, Pimlico, 1991, 
George Eliot: a life, Penguin Books, 1996, 
142 Strand: A Radical Address in Victorian London, Random House UK, 2006, 
Victorian Bloomsbury, Yale University Press, 2012, 
One Hot Summer: Dickens, Darwin, Disraeli, and the Great Stink of 1858,  Yale University Press, 2017,

References

1947 births
Fellows of the Royal Society of Literature
Officers of the Order of the British Empire
Academics of University College London
Living people
Women biographers
Fellows of the British Academy
Heidelberg University alumni
Scottish literary critics
Alumni of the University of Aberdeen
German literature academics
Scottish linguists